Nassereith is a municipality and a village in the Imst district of Austria and is located 11 km north of Imst on the upper course of the Gurgl brook. The village was mentioned in documents for the first time in 1150 but settlement had already began 200-300BC. The main source of income is tourism but Nassereith is now also a community for commuters.

Population

Gallery

References

External links

Lechtal Alps
Mieming Range
Cities and towns in Imst District